The Mitsubishi Tredia is a subcompact sedan built by Mitsubishi Motors from 1982 to 1990. Its name is supposedly derived from Mitsubishi's "Three Diamonds" logo. Alongside the Cordia and Starion, it was one of the first cars imported and sold to America (and Panama) by the company without the involvement of its then partner, the Chrysler Corporation. In Japan, it was sold at a specific retail chain called Car Plaza.

Overview
Designed to fit between the existing Galant and Lancer models to increase the overall lineup of passenger vehicles, the Cordia and Tredia used front-wheel drive and were similar in design to the contemporary Mirage (although larger). The 1600 Turbo received alloy wheels, a hood scoop, and a sticker/stripe combo along the flank. It also benefitted from stiffer suspension than its brethren.

The Tredia was usually offered with comparably complete equipment, usually including rear headrests, adjustable steering wheel, and a graphic heat and ventilation indicator (colored arrows showing how the air moves around the cabin). As with the Mirage/Colt on which the Tredia was based, the standard transmission was Mitsubishi's Super Shift with high and low gears, giving eight forward speeds. This was also installed in the Turbo models. Later on, a regular five-speed gearbox replaced the Super Shift in many models, although it continued to be available until the Tredia was discontinued in 1990.

The cars were given a mild facelift in 1983, and four-wheel drive was offered beginning in October 1984. The engine range was overhauled in 1985 to allow the cars to run on unleaded fuel, including the introduction of a 1.8 L engine in both  naturally aspirated and  turbocharged form, before production was discontinued in 1990.

Market specifics
The Tredia (and Cordia) entered most European markets in October 1982. In several countries it acted as the replacement for the rear-wheel-drive Lancer, although they were built in parallel for many years. The main engine installed was the  1.6-litre, later this was joined by the 1.8-liter  Saturn engine, fitted with a regular five-speed transmission and also available with four-wheel drive. There was also a turbocharged version of the 1.6 which produces  at 5500 rpm in European trim.

U.S. market cars were of a somewhat different appearance, with considerably larger bumpers and unintegrated sealed-beam headlights.

The Tredia was assembled, alongside the Cordia with which it shared many 'under the skin' parts, in New Zealand by Todd Motors, later Mitsubishi New Zealand. The cars were imported as CKD kits and were built with about 40% local content including glass, upholstery, carpet, wiring harnesses and radiators. Both normally aspirated and turbocharged versions were made. All models were initially 1.6-litre but the normally aspirated model was later changed to a 1.8-litre engine at the same time as the original 4x2 'Supershift' manual transmission was changed to a conventional five-speed gearbox. Normally aspirated models were also offered with a conventional three-speed automatic gearbox. In 1985 Todd's added an additional automatic-only 1.8SE trim version with two-tone paint, power windows and locks and four-speaker factory-fit audio system.

Gallery

References

Tredia
Front-wheel-drive vehicles
Subcompact cars
Sedans
Cars introduced in 1982

1990s cars
Cars discontinued in 1990